National Centre for the Performing Arts may refer to

 National Center for the Performing Arts, former name of the John F. Kennedy Center for the Performing Arts, Washington D.C., United States
 National Centre for the Performing Arts (China)
 National Centre for the Performing Arts (India)